In the Zone is a 1917 stage play by Eugene O'Neill.

Plot
The adventures of the crew of a small tramp steamer in World War I.

Characters
The cast of characters in In the Zone is listed in the 1919 collectionThe Moon of the Caribbees and Six Other Plays of the Sea.
 Smitty
 Davis
 Swanson
 Scotty
 Ivan
 Paul
 Jack
 Driscoll
 Cocky

Adaptations

Opening 
In the Zone opened October 31, 1917 by The Washington Square Players at The Comedy Theatre.

1946 British TV version
The BBC produced a version in 1946. The cast included Bonar Colleano, Finlay Currie, Alec Mango and Jack Newmark. Broadcast live, the transmissions were not recorded, and as such it is lost.

1957 Australian TV version

A 1957 version of In the Zone was a very early attempt at Australian television drama, airing during the first few months of TV in that country.

It was produced in Sydney and telerecorded/kinescoped for Melbourne broadcast (these were the only two cities in Australia with television at the time), and aired on ABC, and was broadcast in a 30-minute time-slot.

Archival status is unknown. Most of the very early Australian television drama were adaptations of overseas stage plays, or new versions of works originally presented on the BBC in the UK. In the Zone was an example of both, as the play had previously been presented on the BBC during 1946. It is not known if the two versions used the same script.

Premise
The lives of the crew of a tramp steamer in World War I.

Cast
Bruce Beeby as Davis
Richard Meikle as Jack
Keith Buckley as Scotty
Owen Weingott as Smitty
John Bluthal as Driscoll
Bruce Wishart as Cocky

Other versions
A different version may have aired on British television in 1960.

The play formed part of the basis for the 1940 film The Long Voyage Home.

See also
List of live television plays broadcast on Australian Broadcasting Corporation (1950s)

References

External links
 In the Zone at the Internet Broadway Database
1946 BBC TV version on IMDb
1957 ABC TV version on IMDb

1917 plays
1946 television films
1957 television plays
Lost BBC episodes
Australian television plays
Plays by Eugene O'Neill